Allan & Co was a former railway rolling stock and tram manufacturer based in Rotterdam, Netherlands. The full name of the company (in Dutch) was Allan & Co´s Koninklijke Nederlandsche Fabrieken van Meubelen en Spoorwegmaterieel N.V. The company ceased business in 1959. 

The company was founded in 1839 and started as a furniture maker. The first trams were built in 1902 and the first railway carriages in 1910. Allan went on to become a major supplier to the Netherlands Railways, including the Plan X Blue Angel diesel trains. The company also built rolling stock for export, such as the Class 0300 railcars for the Portuguese Railways.

References

External link

Rolling stock manufacturers of the Netherlands